Jeffrey Victor Rosenfeld   (born 1952) is an Australian neurosurgeon and professor of medicine. He is a senior neurosurgeon in the Department of Neurosurgery at The Alfred Hospital, and the Emeritus Professor of Surgery at Monash University, as well as being a major general in the Australian Defence Force, where he has served as a general surgeon since 1984.  His research has focussed on traumatic brain injury, bionic vision, and medical engineering. He is best known for devising an operation to remove hypothalamic haematomas from children's brains. Since 2021 he has been the Patron of the Australian Friends of Sheba Medical Centre organization.

Early life and education 

Rosenfeld grew up in the Melbourne suburb of Malvern, where he dreamed of being a doctor from the age of five, and he tended to the family pets wearing a borrowed lab coat.
He attended Melbourne High School then studied medicine at the University of Melbourne, graduating in 1976 with an MB BS.  This was followed by surgical training at the Royal Melbourne Hospital.
He obtained a PhD from the University of Connecticut in 1983, with his dissertation "Neuronal and glial abnormalities in myelin deficient mutant mice".
He went on to neurosurgical training, completing post-fellowship training at the Radcliffe Infirmary, Oxford, UK and was Chief Resident in Neurological Surgery at the Cleveland Clinic Foundation, Ohio, USA.

Medical career 

Rosenfeld's first involvement with developing countries was when he travelled to Port Moresby, Papua New Guinea, as a trainee surgeon. He has since operated on people from the US, UK, Africa, Papua New Guinea, and East Timor. He has served as a general surgeon with Australian Defence Forces in East Timor, Bougainville and Rwanda.

Military 

Rosenfeld joined the Army Reserve in 1984 and his ongoing interest in Third World medicine started with a six-month posting to Papua New Guinea.

He continued to make regular tours to disadvantaged countries and his unit was sent to war-ravaged Rwanda in 1995 as part of a UN mission; he was a general surgeon with the rank of lieutenant-colonel. "We had stabbings, we had gunshot wounds," he said. "We had children who'd been macheted in the head in order to murder them and had miraculously survived those injuries." In Rwanda, he also had to deal with landmine injuries and this drove him to champion the cause to ban them, working with the International Landmines Council.

By 2011 he was a brigadier, still returning to Papua New Guinea each year to train local medical staff in advanced surgical techniques.  He became the surgeon general of Defence Force Reserves.  He served on eight deployments, including to Rwanda, East Timor, Bougainville, Solomon Islands and Iraq, and by 2018 he had risen to the rank of major general in the Australian Defence Force.

Academic 

, he is Senior Neurosurgeon in the Department of Neurosurgery at The Alfred Hospital, and the Emeritus Professor of Surgery at Monash University.

In addition to his role as the Emeritus Professor of Surgery at Monash University, Rosenfeld is also Adjunct Professor in Surgery, F. Edward Hébert School of Medicine, Uniformed Services University of the Health Sciences, Bethesda, Maryland, USA, Adjunct Professor (Research), Department of Electrical and Computer Systems Engineering, Monash University, Adjunct Honorary Professor in Surgery, Chinese University of Hong Kong, Founding Director, Monash Institute of Medical Engineering (MIME), Honorary Professor of Surgery, University of Papua New Guinea, and Honorary Consultant Neurosurgeon, Longgang Central Hospital, Shenzhen, Peoples Republic of China.

Clinical and research 

Rosenfeld's research has focussed on the areas of neurosurgery, traumatic brain injury, bionic vision, and medical engineering.

He pioneered the surgical technique to remove hypothalamic hamartomas from the brain. This type of tumour causes gelastic epilepsy, and they are located in a very inaccessible area inside the brain. The conventional surgical approach was to access the brain from below, because the tumour is closer to the bottom; Rosenfeld's novel approach was to access it from above, using a microscope to navigate down between the brain's hemispheres. In 1997, he performed the first such operation on 4-year-old Tom Leray-Meyer. Before the surgery, Leray-Meyer had the intellectual development of a one-year old, he could barely walk and he had fits every five to ten minutes. By 2001, his father was able to take him to see his first cricket match. The first international patient for this surgery was American Joelle Rue in May 2000, and she was followed by regular patients from overseas.

In 2001, he won international acclaim for performing life-changing surgery to remove a hypothalamic hamartoma from a nine-year-old British boy, Sebastian Selo. The technique had previously been used successfully on 18 children at that time, but Selo was the most critical; since he was a baby he suffered up to 100 epileptic fits each day and difficulty speaking, caused by a tumour the size of a grape which had grown in his brain, about  down, behind his eyes. A surgery attempt in Britain four years earlier had not been successful, and caused a disabling stroke. Rosenfeld liquefied the tumour using a high-frequency aspirator so that it could then be sucked away in a four-hour operation. A year later, Selo's seizures were rare, and they did not prevent him leading a normal life. They were re-united in Great Britain when Rosenfeld visited to teach the technique to British surgeons.  After the attention for that success, children from around the world were coming to the Royal Children's Hospital for the same surgery and Rosenfeld personally performed over 70 of them.

He operated on the Australian celebrity Molly Meldrum after his brain injury, caused by a fall from a ladder in 2011.

In 2011, he published in The New England Journal of Medicine the first multicentre randomised controlled trial about the effectiveness of decompressive craniectomy (surgically removing a section of skull to allow the pressure from swelling to abate), compared to drug therapy.

His team has developed an artificial vision system named Gennaris that may provide a degree of sight for blind people. It uses special glasses that connect wirelessly to an implant on the surface of the brain, generating a matrix of 172 spots called "phosphenes" (to expand to 473) to allow that the person to perceive a rudimentary view of whatever is there. In July 2020, the team published a report of a trial of this technology in sheep.  Human trials will be next, initially with only a few volunteers, then increasing over time.  Describing the level of detail they hope the devices will provide, Rosenfeld said "They won't be able to recognise the detail of a person's face... but they will be able to recognise where a staircase is, where a door or door handle is, common things you need to navigate... in everyday life."

Public health advocacy 

Rosenfeld has used his public profile to speak out on matters of violence and social justice.

In 2008, together with psychiatrist Major Nick Ford, he warned about unidentified brain injuries which returned military suffer, caused by pressure waves from explosions.  More concerning, there could be a cumulative effect from exposure to multiple explosions. But there are no external wounds to see, so these injuries are often not detected. In Afghanistan, these invisible injuries make up some 12 per cent of wounds inflicted on Australian troops. In 2011, he organised an international conference on the topic, explaining that it can leave victims with brain damage, depression, and post-traumatic stress. In 2009, he compiled a collection of brain scans to show young people how just one blow to the head can be fatal, or lead to lifelong brain injury.

He was the keynote speaker at the 2020 Holocaust Remembrance Day, comparing it to the Rwandan genocide which he witnessed personally as a military surgeon.

He also contributed to the public debates on football's history of poorly managing cases of repeated head injuries, the value of making bicycle helmets compulsory, the role of alcohol in violent head injuries and in car crashes, and the risks of boxing.

Published works

Journal articles
, PubMed lists 291 articles with him as an author, and ResearchGate lists 397.
Google Scholar calculates his h-index as 67.

Books
 
 
 
 
 Category Winner - Tertiary Education (Wholly Australian) Student Resource, Australian Publishers Association – Australian Educational Publishing Awards 2013.

, Monash University also lists 27 book chapters which he has published.

Awards and recognition 

On 13 June 2011, in the Queens Birthday honours, Rosenfeld was appointed a member of the Order of Australia (AM).
In June 2013, he was appointed an Officer of the Order of the British Empire (OBE), presented in person by Queen Elizabeth II and the Governor-General of Papua New Guinea.
Then in the Australia Day honours of 2018, he was appointed a Companion of the Order of Australia (AC) for "eminent service to medicine, particularly to the discipline of neurosurgery, as an academic and clinician, to medical research and professional organisations, and to the health and welfare of current and former defence force members".

Other recognition includes:
 2001 - "Victorian of the Year" declared by Melbourne's Herald Sun newspaper
 2009 - Michael E DeBakey International Military Surgeons' Award for excellence in military surgery
 2012 - Rotary Club of Melbourne’s Monash Medal
 2018 - International Lifetime Recognition Award from the American Association of Neurological Surgeons
 King James IV Professorship from the Royal College of Surgeons in Edinburgh
 Syme Professorship from the Royal College of Surgeons of Edinburgh

Professional fellowships and board memberships include:
 2016 - Fellow of the Australian Academy of Technological Sciences (FTSE) 
 Fellow of the Australian Academy of Health and Medical Sciences (FAHMS) 
 Fellow of Royal Australasian College of Surgeons (FRACS)
 Fellow of the Royal College of Surgeons (FRCS)(Edin) 
 Fellow of the American College of Surgeons (FACS) since 1997
 International Fellow of the American Association of Neurological Surgeons (IFAANS)
 He is on the board of the Society for Brain Mapping & Therapeutics, based in California.
 Since 2020, he has been a non-executive director of Clinuvel Pharmaceuticals

Personal life 

Rosenfeld is married to Debbie Kipen, a pediatrician at the Royal Children's Hospital.  He gives a lot of the credit for his own success to his wife, saying "I couldn't do what I have done without the work my wife does... We need to look at it as a partnership."  The couple has three children, Hannah, Alex and Gabriella (gab).

In his spare time, he volunteers with St John Ambulance to offer emergency first aid at the football; he is also the former commissioner of St John Ambulance for the state of Victoria.

He plays several musical instruments, with the clarinet being his main focus – he performed in the Australian Youth Orchestra – and he is still Principal Clarinet in a Melbourne-based orchestra of medical people called "Corpus Medicorum". He has said that he hopes to complete a music degree when he eventually retires.

References

External links 
 
 Gennaris Bionic Eye site at Monash University

Living people
1952 births
20th-century Australian medical doctors
21st-century Australian medical doctors
Australian neurosurgeons
Australian medical researchers
Medical doctors from Melbourne
Fellows of the Royal Australasian College of Physicians
Fellows of the Royal College of Surgeons
Companions of the Order of Australia
Academic staff of Monash University
University of Melbourne alumni
People educated at Melbourne High School
People from Malvern, Victoria
Military personnel from Melbourne
Australian Defence Force
Australian generals
University of Connecticut alumni